Don Carroll Bliss Jr. (July 3, 1897 Northville, Michigan-1978 New York) was the American Ambassador to Ethiopia from 1957 until 1960.

Biography
Bliss graduated from Dartmouth College in 1918 and became a career foreign service officer after graduation. He served in the US Navy during World War II. He married Gabriela De Cubas, a daughter of a Spanish diplomat, in 1946.  Together they translated Cervantes: The Man and the Genius.

References

External links
230. Despatch From the Consulate at Mogadiscio to the Department of State

People from Northville, Michigan
Dartmouth College alumni
Ambassadors of the United States to Ethiopia